Vellakkaara Durai is a 2014 Indian Tamil-language romantic comedy film directed by Ezhil. The film stars Vikram Prabhu, Sri Divya, Soori, and John Vijay. The film commenced shoot from May 2014. The film opened to mostly mixed-to-negative review from critics, and it was hit at box office.

Plot

Police Pandi (Soori), the owner of a real estate agency, borrows 15 lakhs from Vatti Varadhan (John Vijay), a local rowdy and don, to start his business. Murugan (Vikram Prabhu) is Pandi's assistant, and he gives the media an advertisement in which he persuades people to buy land from 'his' company, making many people persuaded from it. A billionaire wants to buy all the land, and when he is about to sign the papers, they find out that the land is actually a graveyard, causing the billionaire to not buy the land. When Pandi and Murugan are in a bar drinking alcohol, a call comes on Pandi's phone. Murugan answers it, thinking that it was the broker who sold them the land, but it was actually Varadhan. Murugan talks to Varadhan in foul language, and when he ends the call, Pandi tells him that it was actually Varadhan. He then goes to another table and asks a man for some booze. The whole group befriends the man, who is mute.

The next morning, they find themselves in Varadhan's house, where it is just like jail. There are many people who work there because they could not give back the money they borrowed. They all end up working there, except for Murugan, who saved Varadhan when a few men tried to kill him, causing him to become his supervisor. One day, a worker in there gets to go home, revealing to the others that 'Chinnamma' lets some people go. When Murugan inquires about her to Pandi, he tells him that she is Varadhan's sister. Murugan then goes to her room and threatens her to let them go as well, but when he sees 'Chinnamma', whose real name is Yamuna (Sri Divya), Murugan immediately falls for her and starts wooing her, but she does not accept him. One day, Varadhan arranges for his engagement, and Murugan and Pandi start arranging everything. When the Iyar Swamji asks them to bring the bride, Murugan gets shocked seeing Yamuna as the bride. When Pandi asks Varadhan's servants why they brought Varadhan's sister, they revealed that she is not his sister and is the woman that he has been waiting to marry. Murugan drinks booze after hearing this but then sees Yamuna escaping. Yamuna and Murugan get on a lorry, and Yamuna reveals why she escaped.

Yamuna's mother died when she was five years old, and her father Manickam (Gnanavel) looked after her. Manickam takes care of the people's problems, considers them as his own, and helps them. He promises the men that he will give Varadhan the money they borrowed, and helps them. One day, Manickam dies, and no one helps Yamuna give Varadhan the money that Manickam promised to give. Varadhan gives her an idea by saying that if she marries him, she will not need to give the money, so Yamuna reluctantly agrees. Murugan then asks if she needs any help, but Yamuna refuses, and they separate. Somehow, Varadhan finds them and hits Murugan unconscious. He forcefully takes Yamuna with him and arranges their marriage. However, the man who is unable to speak, later revealed to be a terrorist, dies, and their marriage stops. Yamuna sees Murugan, hugs him, and asks him to kill Varadhan and stop the marriage. Murugan agrees and plans to kill him, but everything does not go according to plan. Murugan and Pandi stop the wedding by saying that there is a bomb attached to Pandi and it will explode. Some terrorists kidnap Varadhan. It turns out that the bomb on Pandi isn't a dummy one but the real thing. Everyone escapes the house except Pandi. Yamuna and Murugan are united together by quarreling. In the end, the bomb explodes and Pandi is launched up like a rocket.

Cast

Production
Ezhil and Vikram Prabhu agreed terms to begin a film project in November 2013 for producer Anbu, adding that the shoot would start in early 2014. The shoot of the film began in April 2014 in Thanjavur with Vikram reportedly playing a singer, while Sri Divya, Soori, John Vijay and M. S. Bhaskar were added to the cast. The film was titled as Vellaikaara Durai in June 2014.

Soundtrack

Music was composed by D. Imman, collaborating with Ezhil for the third time after Manam Kothi Paravai and Desingu Raja. The soundtrack contains 4 songs. 3 songs were written by Yugabharathi and 1 song were written by Vairamuthu. The album was released on 9 December 2014 at Suryan FM Radio station and received mixed reviews. Behindwoods rated the album 2.5/5 stating "Vellaikaara Durai is a neat album where Imman plays it very safe.". Sify rated the album 2.5/5 stating "Imman has a forgettable outing"

Critical reception
The Hindu wrote, "The film takes a story template and incorporates into it one ridiculous joke after another...To be fair, the film only tries to deliver on what it promises — a laugh riot with all the masala elements to satisfy the B and C centres", with the critic concluding that "Vellaikaara Durai could be the secret pleasure you would never admit to have enjoyed". Sify wrote, "The problem with Vellaikara Durai is that the actors try too hard to be funny but the writing does not offer anything new", going on to call it an "average comedy entertainer which might appeal to audience who never expect logic but only mindless comedies".

References

External links
 

2014 films
2010s Tamil-language films
2014 romantic comedy-drama films
Films directed by Ezhil
Indian romantic comedy-drama films